The following is a list of unincorporated areas (territoires non organisés) in Quebec.

There are no unorganized territories in the following administrative regions: Centre-du-Québec, Chaudière-Appalaches, Estrie, Laval, Montérégie, Montreal.

List

References 
 Region 01
 Region 02
 Region 03
 Region 04
 Region 07
 Region 08
 Region 09
 Region 10
 Region 11
 Region 14
 Region 15

Lists of populated places in Quebec